Alfred Arthur James (25 August 1887 – 12 February 1938) was a member of the Queensland Legislative Assembly.

Biography
James was born in Warragul, Victoria, the son of Samuel Arthur James and his wife Alice (née Cleak). He was educated in Warragul and after leaving school he worked as a farmhand. He then was a journalist and editor for the Producer in Caboolture.

On 30 April 1910 he married Eliese Ebert in Prahran and together had three daughters. James died in February 1938.

Public career
James, representing the Labor Party, won the seat of Logan at the 1918 Queensland state election, defeating Reginald King, the National candidate. By the time of the 1920 state election, James had switched to the Country Party but lost to his 1918 opponent, Reginald King.

References

Members of the Queensland Legislative Assembly
1887 births
1938 deaths
Australian Labor Party members of the Parliament of Queensland
20th-century Australian politicians
People from Warragul